Antonio A. Casilli (born 1972) is a Professor of Sociology at Télécom Paris, the school of telecommunications engineering of the Polytechnic Institute of Paris, and an Associate Researcher at the School for Advanced Studies in the Social Sciences. His research focuses on computer-mediated communication, labour, and fundamental rights. He has been a regular commentator at La Grande Table and Place de la Toile on France Culture.

Research Domains 

After his first work on the impact of industrial technologies on the imagery of the body, under the influence of Donna Haraway and Antonio Negri, he studied the communicational violence and digital cultures. In Les Liaisons numériques, he analyses the uses of information and communications technologies and the impact of practices of the representation of the self (avatars, photos, and autobiographical accounts) on social structures, communication codes, social capital and privacy. His research also explores the relationship between information technologies and health. His methods combine participant observation and advanced research tools for social research such as multi-agent systems and social network analysis.

Privacy on social media 
Antonio Casilli studies the concept of privacy, criticising the hypothesis of the end of privacy as a consequence of the uses of social media. Instead of arguing that privacy is disappearing, he observes a change of perception in society. The privacy of an individual is characterised by the construction and the management of online social capital. Casilli proposes a new representation model of privacy, where it is learnt as a negotiable entity: not purely from an individual decision, but from a permanent negotiation. In this case, social media users adapt to the publication of personal information in their social circles, and on the feedback given by their contacts. The private and public characteristics do not intervene first but as a function of collective variables.

Digital labor 
Casilli's main theoretical contribution concerns the transformation of labor by digital platforms. Notably, how automation, instead of causing a replacement of jobs, in reality, displaces them through business outsourcing processes and the reduction of human action to its smallest possible unit: a click (a process called taskification). Digital labour platforms play a fundamental role in breaking up and outsourcing these tasks to millions of workers around the world, most of them located in developing countries. According to him, these platforms render the human labour invisible to consumers, but it is nonetheless essential to train, maintain, correct, and even impersonate artificial intelligence systems. 

In his book En attendant les robots (Waiting for robots), Casilli identifies three types of platforms were users—and workers—provide digital labor: 
 "On-demand" services, such as Uber and Foodora. 
 "Micro-work" platforms, such as Amazon Mechanical Turk.
 Social media platforms, such as Facebook and YouTube.

Bibliography  
 La Fabbrica libertina. De Sade e il sistema industriale, Manifesto Libri, 1997.
 Stop mobbing. DeriveApprodi, 2000.
 
 (With Paola Tubaro et Yasaman Sarabi) Against the hypothesis of the end of privacy, Springer, 2014.
 With Dominique Cardon,

References 

Living people
1972 births
Internet culture
Italian sociologists